{{Infobox film
| name           = Gangs of Wasseypur
| image          = Gangs of Wasseypur.jpg
| caption        = Original quad poster
| director       = Anurag Kashyap
| producer       = 
| writer         = 
| starring       = 
| music          = 
| cinematography = Rajeev Ravi
| editing        = Shweta Venkat
| studio         = 
| distributor    = Viacom 18 Motion Pictures
| released       = May 2012 (Cannes)  22 June 2012 (Part 1)  8 August 2012 (Part 2)
| runtime        = 321 minutes<ref name=Runtime>{{cite web|title=GANS OF WASSEYPUR – PART 1 (15) |url=http://www.bbfc.co.uk/releases/gangs-wasseypur-2013 |archive-url=https://archive.today/20130419202946/http://www.bbfc.co.uk/releases/gangs-wasseypur-2013 |url-status=dead |archive-date=19 April 2013 |work=British Board of Film Classification |access-date=9 February 2013 }}</ref>
| country        = India
| language       = Hindi
| budget         =  crore
| gross          =   crore
}}Gangs of Wasseypur is a 2012 Indian Hindi-language two-part crime film produced and directed by Anurag Kashyap, and written by Kashyap and Zeishan Quadri. Centered on the coal mafia (Mafia Raj) of Dhanbad, and the underlying power struggles, politics and vengeance between three crime families, the film has an ensemble cast, with Manoj Bajpai, Nawazuddin Siddiqui, Pankaj Tripathi, Richa Chadda, Huma Qureshi and Tigmanshu Dhulia in the major roles. Its story spans 68 years from 1941 to 2009. It is regarded as one of the best films ever made in India.

Both parts were originally shot as a single film measuring a total of 321 minutes and screened at the 2012 Cannes Directors' Fortnight, but, since no Indian theatre would volunteer to screen a more-than-five-hour film, it was split into two parts for that market.

Both films received critical acclaim and were commercially successful. In 2019, The Guardian listed it 59th on the 100 greatest movies of the 21st century.

Cast

 Manoj Bajpayee as Sardar Khan, Shahid Khan's only son; Nagma and Durga's husband; Danish, Faizal, Perpendicular, and Definite's father; Mohsina and Shama's father in law; Feroz's grandfather.
 Jaideep Ahlawat as Shahid Khan, the patriarch of the Khan family; Sardar's father; Nagma and Durga's father-in-law; Danish, Faizal, Perpendicular, Definite's grandfather, Mohsina and Shama's grandfather in law; Feroz's great grandfather.
 Nawazuddin Siddiqui as Faizal Khan, Sardar, and Nagma's second son; Durga's stepson; Danish, Perpendicular's brother; Definite's stepbrother; Mohsina's husband; Feroz's father.
 Richa Chadda as Nagma Khatoon, Sardar's first wife; Danish, Faizal, Perpendicular's mother; Shama and Mohsina's mother in law; Feroz's grandmother.
 Piyush Mishra as Nasir, Shahid Khan's servant, Sardar's sworn uncle, and narrator in the movie
 Jameel Khan as Asghar Khan, Nasir's nephew, and Sardar's sworn cousin
 Reema Sen as Durga, Sardar's second wife; Definite's mother; Danish, Faizal, and Perpendicular's stepmother.                                                                                                                                                                                                                                              
 Huma Qureshi as Mohsina Hamid, Faizal's wife
 Zeishan Quadri as Definite Khan, Sardar's son from Durga                                                                                                                                                                                                                                             
 Vineet Kumar Singh as Danish Khan, Sardar's eldest son
 Tigmanshu Dhulia as Ramadhir Singh, a criminal-turned-politician.
 Pankaj Tripathi as Sultan Qureshi, nephew of Sultana Daku, one of Sardar's enemies.
 Satyakam Anand as J. P. Singh, Ramadhir's son
 Vipin Sharma as Ehsan Qureshi, Sultan's uncle
 Pramod Pathak as Sultana Daku / Badoor Qureshi
 Anurita Jha as Shama Parveen, Danish's wife and Sultan's sister
 Sanjay Singh as Fazlu, Faisal's friend
 Rajkummar Rao as Shamshad Alam
 Aditya Kumar as Babu "Babua" Khan ("Perpendicular"), Sardar's youngest son
 Yashpal Sharma as Occasional Singer (Guest Appearance)
 Vicky Kaushal as silhouette bystander (Cameo Role)

Parts

Gangs of Wasseypur – Part 1

Gangs of Wasseypur – Part 2

 Critical reception 
Review aggregator website Rotten Tomatoes reports that the film holds a 97% approval rating, based on 31 reviews, with an average score of 8.2/10. The website's critics' consensus reads: "More than five hours go by in a blink in this frantic Indian crime epic that spans generations and encompasses hundreds of characters in a bloody spiral of brutality, all masterfully filmed by Anurag Kashyap." The film holds a Metacritic score of 89 based on 10 reviews, indicating "universal acclaim".

Critic Danny Bowes of RogerEbert.com called it "[o]ne of the most ambitious gangster films ever made, and quite possibly one of the best", writing that it is "worthy of discussion alongside Coppola's first two Godfather films, or Leone's Once Upon a Time in America." Salon's Andrew O'Hehir wrote: "As a rich and exuberant character-driven crime saga in an idiom you absolutely have not encountered before, and a dense, unsentimental portrayal of the collision between democracy, capitalism, and gangsterism on the frayed margins of the post-colonial world, Gangs of Wasseypur is a signal achievement in 21st-century cinema." Martin Scorsese, one of Kashyap's influences on the films and personal heroes, sent a letter to Kashyap, offering praise, stating that he "loved them", even expressing a desire to meet him.

In September 2019, The Guardian ranked Gangs of Wasseypur in 59th place in its 100 best films of the 21st century list, and give it review as:
"A possible turning point in Hindi cinema, Anurag Kashyap's epic drama doesn't pull any punches in its portrayal of gangster life in an Indian mining town".
 Gangs Of Wasseypur’s success led to a number of Hindi movies across the next few years that were essentially inelegant variations on the “hinterland gangsters” theme.

Awards and nominations

Box office
However, Gangs of Wasseypur's box office records vary from website to website, sources to sources, but "it did a great business at box office" stated by The Guardian''.

According to Box Office India, both parts combined grossed , against a combined budget of 
.

Notes

References

See also
Faheem Khan

External links

Indian films about revenge
2010s Hindi-language films
Indian crime drama films
Films set in the 1940s
Films set in the 1950s
Films set in the 1960s
Films set in the 1970s
Films set in the 1980s
Films set in the 1990s
2012 crime drama films
Indian crime thriller films
Indian gangster films
Indian epic films
Films set in Bihar
Films set in Uttar Pradesh
Films set in West Bengal
Films shot in India
Films set in India
Films about organised crime in India
Films about corruption in India
Indian film series
Films set in the British Empire
Films set in the Indian independence movement
Films directed by Anurag Kashyap
Crime in Jharkhand
Films shot in Bihar
Films released in separate parts
Films with screenplays by Anurag Kashyap
2012 crime thriller films
2012 films